is a character series created by Sanrio in 2001, with character designs from Miyuki Okumura. The main character, Cinnamoroll, is a white puppy with chubby cheeks and long ears, blue eyes, pink cheeks, and a tail that resembles a cinnamon roll. He starred in his own manga series, an anime movie, and various animation shorts.

Story
Cinnamoroll is a white dog who lives at Café Cinnamon. He is friends with Chiffon, Mocha, Espresso, Cappuccino, and Milk.

Characters

 (Japan), Sunday Muse ("The Adventures of Hello Kitty & Friends"), Jenny Yokobori ("Hello Kitty and Friends: Supercute Adventures")
 Cinnamoroll (born March 6) is a male white and chubby puppy with long ears that enable him to fly. He has blue eyes, pink cheeks, and a tail that resembles a cinnamon roll. Cinnamoroll flies around the town looking for fun and new adventures with his friends and one of his main hobbies is eating.

 Cappuccino (born June 27) is a male puppy living in the house with the red roof across the street from Café Cinnamon. He likes to go at his own pace, eat a lot, and take naps. Cappuccino is easy to recognize by his mouth, which is just like a cup of cappuccino, and likes eating, but his favorite thing of all is napping. He is the glutton of the bunch and very chubby. He also loves bug catching which is his favorite activity. When Coco and Nuts were introduced in 2007, Cappuccino became a brother and looks out for the duo.

 Chiffon (born January 14) is a female puppy living right by a lush, green park and is the most energetic of the pups. Chiffon inspires her friends and doesn't sweat the small stuff. Her ears, which are fluffy like a chiffon cake, are her standout feature. She is also a Tomboy and she loves to play tennis. She has a sensitive side when it comes to animals. She loves sports and dreams of winning a gold medal at the Olympics one day. Cinnamon has a crush on her and is also an animal lover. Alongside Mocha and Azuki, they make up the three-girl idol group Cinnamonangels and wears stylish hat. Chiffon's ear and tail color are usually brown, though sometimes it's colored orange as seen in the manga, and very rarely pink.

 Espresso (born December 4) is a male puppy living near the park in the biggest house around. Espresso is very intelligent and well-bred, but he gets lonely and whines sometimes. He's known for his distinguished Mozart hairstyle. His owner is a famous actress, and his dad is a well-known movie director. Espresso is especially good at drawing, painting, and music. But he can’t sleep without his favorite blanket which makes him whine and cry like a sad puppy so very much. In the Manga, He wears a red or green Beret and a red or green kerchief.

 Mocha (born February 20) is a female puppy living in a white house on top of a hill. She's a stylish chatterbox and also the "big sister" of the bunch, always looking out for others. Mocha is known for her silky chocolate-brown fur and her pink bows with flowers. She has a crush on Cinnamon and loves fashion and getting dressed up but doesn’t like bell peppers or bugs. She is the girly girl of the group. In the Manga, Mocha's fur color is light brown and she is seen wearing different hair accessories besides her pink flowers. Alongside Chiffon and Azuki, they make up the three-girl idol group Cinnamonangels and the leader of the group.

 Milk (born February 4) is a baby male pup living close to the park in a house with a chimney. The smallest and youngest of the pups, he likes being cuddled and will whine and cry if he doesn't have his favorite pacifier. Milk can be recognized by his blue Pacifier and the single curl of baby hair on top of his head. He can get spoiled sometimes. He wants to be just like Cinnamon when he grows up. His pacifier is his most prized possession, and he’s skilled at gulping down large quantities of milk. Milk can't talk so the only words he can say are "Ba-Boo".

 Cornet is a unicorn kid who lives in the sky above the clouds. He has a light blue coat, a pink mane, and a tail and his horn is shaped like an ice cream cone.

 Coco (born July 25) is a baby male pup who wears a red scarf around his neck. He along with his twin brother Nuts was rescued by Cinnamon when a white stork got shocked by lightning during a thunderstorm, causing the bag to fall from its beak. Cinnamon, quickly flew down to catch the bag that the stork was carrying. By the time Cinnamon landed on the ground. He opened the bag to reveal that two newborn puppies were inside. Cinnamon then carried Coco and Nuts to Café Cinnamon to give them a new home. Coco's fur color is light brown and has a white spot on his mouth like his big brother Cappuccino and his twin brother Nuts. Coco and his brother Nuts both have different styles of ears. Coco and Nuts both appear in the 5th volume of the manga, where Cinnamon babysits the two while Cappuccino is away.

 Nuts (born July 25) is a baby male pup who wears a blue scarf around his neck. He is more curious than his brother Coco and is often seen sleeping. Nut's Fur color is the same as Coco's fur color. Nuts along with his twin brother Coco appear in the 5th volume of the manga, where Cinnamon babysits the two while Cappuccino is away.

 Poron is a female light pink puppy who wears a puffy light blue bow on her head and owns a time compass that helps her on her journey with Cinnamon. She is her third female friend of Cinnamon. She is a time traveler and one given day, she dropped out of the sky on Cinnamoroll's fluffy head. They became friends and go on adventures with Cornet. She was first introduced on Cinnamoroll's Japanese Twitter account, in April 2014. Her body is fluffy like clouds and her tail also resembles an angel wing. She also makes occasional appearances on the official Cinnamoroll Twitter account.

 Azuki (born September 25) is a female puppy who dreams to become an idol. She is ladylike, but sometimes a little bit off in terms of personality. She is in charge of the Cinnamonangels' manners, and fortune-telling and also practices calligraphy and flower arrangement in hopes of becoming a true Japanese lady.

 Berry (born June 6) is a male demon with ram horns and black bat wings, who has the ability to transform into a more devilish form; his ram horns turn into devil's horns, gold eyes, grows sharp fangs, changes colors from medium-grey to dark-black, skeleton wings, sharp talon-like claws, and his voice changes. He seems to have a talent for making potions. Both Berry and Cherry would go through their magic mirror to enter into the human world to play tricks on children while they sleep. The duo fears daytime and would hide in the closet or drawers if they don't make it home in time until night returns. They are friends with a bat, a magical lantern, and a jack o' lantern. Berry serves as a narrator in the anime Onegai♪My Melody Kirara★, alongside Cherry.

 Cherry (born September 9) is a female demon and Berry's partner-in-crime; who was created when Berry accidentally used a jar of salt that had its label covered by another, written as "sugar". When Cherry transforms into her devilish form, her light-black closed bat wing ears change into dark-black opened bat wings, her black eyes into fandango eyes, her top hat disappears, her teeth into fangs, and her voice changes. Cherry loves to play jokes on Berry. Cherry also has a crush on Espresso. Both Berry and Cherry would go through their magic mirror to enter into the human world to play tricks on children while they sleep. The duo fears daytime and would hide in the closet or drawers if they don't make it home in time until night returns. They are friends with a bat, a magical lantern, and a jack o' lantern. Cherry serves as a narrator in the anime Onegai♪My Melody Kirara★, alongside Berry.

 A human female that owns Café Cinnamon. Before 2005, she was mostly unseen and only mentioned in Cinnamon's character biography. Her first illustrated appearance was in the manga series "Fluffy Fluffy Cinnamoroll" where she was illustrated by Yumi Tsukirino who plays a minor role. She eventually got a redesign in the later volumes where she was given eyes. The Café owner was later named "Anna" in the 2007 film "Cinnamon The Movie". In the film, she was given a third redesign where she wears a pink and red dress and is depicted with light red hair. In the film, she first meets Cinnamon while riding on her bike back to the Café Cinnamon (Named Café Terrace) where Cinnamon falls into her cart. She later gets kidnapped by Chowder's custard monster and plans on marrying her. In Sanrio's official character illustrations by Miyuki Okumura. She is usually seen from the legs up.

 Chowder is a character exclusive to "Cinnamon The Movie" and the main antagonist of the movie. Chowder's a wizard creature that lives in a forest close to the Café. He first discovers Cinnamon from his crystal ball while watching Cinnamon meeting Anna and heading straight to the café. He decides to quickly follow Anna's bike straight to the Café secretly. He decides to cast a spell that summons a monster made of custard with his magic spell causing Cinnamon and his friends to get separated from the café owner leaving Chowder with Cinnamon and his friends. Mocha along with Chiffon, and Espresso are constantly upset and untrustworthy with Chowder throughout the film. Eventually, Chowder regrets his decision and later apologizes to Cinnamon and his friends and the Café owner for the chaos he created at the end of the film. Anna along with Cinnamon and friends later throws a party at the Café after Chowder has a change of heart.

Rename
When he was first created by Sanrio in 2001, he was called Baby Cinnamon. A year later he was "renamed" Cinnamoroll, to remedy any problems with the registration of the mark overseas, however, he is now called in both ways, but also more simply Cinnamon. As of 2007, Cinnamoroll's original name "Baby Cinnamon" is no longer being used by Sanrio and is officially called "Cinnamoroll". In Japan, he is still named "Cinnamoroll" but he is mostly called "Cinnamon".

Media

Anime and video
A movie based on the character titled  was produced by Madhouse Studios and was released in Japan on December 22, 2007. The film was double-billed alongside another Madhouse animated film Nezumi Monogatari - George to Gerald no Bōken. It is directed by Gisaburō Sugii (Night on the Galactic Railroad) and written by Mari Okada (Toradora!, Anohana: The Flower We Saw That Day, Mobile Suit Gundam: Iron-Blooded Orphans). Tohoshinki performed the movie's ending song titled "Together".

Other Cinnamoroll videos include "Zēnbu! Cinnamon", "Cinnamon no Himitsu no Tobira", "ABCinnamon Eigo de Asobo!" and titles in the Sanrio Pokoapoko series.

In 2023 Sanrio started a Youtube channel for Cinnamon which streams a short anime called .

Other appearances
In 2005, the stop-motion series "Hello Kitty Stump Village". Cinnamoroll is one of the main characters next to Hello Kitty, My Melody, Pom Pom Purin, and Badtz-Maru. In 2008, animated CGI TV series The Adventures of Hello Kitty & Friends Cinnamoroll is a minor character, and debuts in an episode called "Cinnamoroll Café" where he is building his own café. But, is too shy to ask for help. He also appears in the 2020 web series, Hello Kitty and Friends: Supercute Adventures hosted on Sanrio's official American Youtube channel where he started out as a minor character in Season 1, before joining the main cast in Season 2 alongside Hello Kitty, Pom Pom Purin, My Melody, Keroppi, Badtz-Maru, Kuromi, and Chococat.

Cinnamoroll is also the host of the boat ride attraction called "Sanrio Character Boat Ride" at Sanrio Puroland and Harmonyland where he invites guests to attend Hello Kitty and Dear Daniel's wedding.

Video games
Cinnamoroll quickly became the star of video games. There are four video games that feature him and his friends. The earliest video games were "Cinnamoroll Koko ni Iru yo" which was released in Japan in 2004, and "Cinnamoroll FuwaFuwa Daibouken" which was released in Japan in 2005 and were only for the Game Boy Advance. Nintendo also made two Nintendo DS games called "Cinnamoroll: Ohanashi shiyo! - Kira Kira DE Kore Café" made in 2006, and a Pinball game called "Cinnamoroll: Kurukuru Sweets Paradise" made in 2007. He also made appearances in Hello Kitty games like "Hello Kitty: Big City Dreams", "Hello Kitty Birthday Adventures" and "Loving Life with Hello Kitty & Friends" for the DS and "Hello Kitty Seasons" on the Wii. Cinnamoroll's friends (notably Cappuccino) also appear in certain areas in "Hello Kitty Seasons". Cinnamoroll also appears in Sanrio's first and only Massively multiplayer online role-playing game called Hello Kitty Online as an NPC in certain special quests. The Cinnamoangels also made cameo appearances in Hello Kitty Online as statues in London alone. While Cinnamoroll's friends Mocha and Chiffon can be seen as one of the emoticons in a Cinnamoroll-themed guild. Cinnamoroll also shows up in "Hello Kitty World" for Android and iPhone as one of the characters you unlock once you add a new attraction when you reach a certain level. Cinnamoroll is also one of the racers in "Hello Kitty Kruisers" which is available for the Android, iPhone, Wii U, and Nintendo Switch.

Manga

A five-volume manga of the series, titled  was written by Chisato Seki and illustrated by Yumi Tsukirino. It was published in Japan from 2004 to 2007 by Shogakukan and serialized in the monthly magazine Pucchigumi. In 2008, three special volumes of the manga came out in Japan called "Fluffy, Fluffy Cinnamoroll Color Edition" (カラー版 ふわふわ♥シナモン Karāban Fuwafuwa Shinamon) which had all the pages for each manga in color and has brand new stories. In 2005, a spin-off manga series that focused on The Cinnamoangels was made from 2005 - 2008 called "Puri Kawa Shinamonenjerusu!!" (プリ☆かわ☆シナモンエンジェルス!!) which focuses on Mocha, Chiffon, and Azuki doing various activities and trying to attract boys. Viz Media started translating the manga in 2011 and was released to English-speaking countries in 2012.

Books
A novel adaptation titled  was released by Kadokawa Shoten under the Tsubasa Bunko label on September 15, 2014, which stars Cinnamoroll and Poron going through various adventures along with doing time traveling.

Cinnamoroll has a series of three travel picture books called "Cinnamon Travel Ehon" (シナモントラベルえほん).  Another Japanese Cinnamoroll book is "Cinnamon ga Ippai!, labeled as an "official fan book"."

Merchandising

Cinnamoroll merchandise include plush toys, stationery and apparel.

Events
Characters of the series also appeared in various Sanrio Puroland and HarmonyLand lives shows, parades, and events. Following their debut in 2007 with their first musical .

Music
Cinnamon was featured in a music video with the Japanese rock girl band Scandal. In June 2012, Sanrio teamed up with MasatakaP to create an animated video coinciding the character's 10th Anniversary using the MikuMikuDance software. The video is handled by MastakaP for the animation while Intetsu, the Bassist of the band Ayabie handles the music. A downloadable version of Cinnamon for use with MikuMikuDance software was available by Sanrio until August 31, 2012. In October 2012, the OSTER project announced an album called "Cinnamon Trip!!", which was released in Japan on December 12, 2012. There are 9 songs in the album, each sung by Cinnamoroll and his friends including the Cinnamoangels and Lloromannic. Each song has its own theme, such as Mocha's song "Petit Paris" which takes place in Paris, France, and "Hawaiian Angels" which takes place in Hawaii and is sung by the Cinnamoangels.

Reception
Cinnamoroll was the second most successful Sanrio character in 2005, after Hello Kitty. The popularity of Cinnamoroll and minor characters kicked off in 2005 with a "spinoff" called The Cinnamoangels which features Cinnamoroll's friend Mocha, Chiffon, and Azuki. In 2011, Cinnamoroll got his own blog on the Japanese blogging and social networking website Ameba. In 2012, Cinnamoroll celebrated his 10th anniversary. To celebrate Cinnamoroll's 10th Anniversary Tokyo's Haneda Airport had a Cinnamoroll showcase showing fan-taken photos and some original Cinnamoroll pictures. There is also a Cinnamoroll statue that can be seen outside Bandai Headquarters in Tokyo, Japan.

Cinnamoroll's official Twitter account experienced cyberbullying in 2015. A group of Twitter users started responding to the account's tweets with offensive comments regarding the character in March 2015, and the disruption worsened in May. On May 11, a tweet from the official Twitter saying: "Chiffon: “Morning! Cinnamon doesn’t want to come all the way out this morning, so I’ve come out instead. I will protect Cinnamon, so I hope all his friends will look after him too.” was posted, referring to the continuous bullying due to haters. In response, Sanrio blocked the culprits.

Cinnamoroll was voted number 1 in the Sanrio Character Rankings 2017-2018, and again in 2020-2022.

References

Further reading

External links
 Official site
 
 

2005 manga
2007 anime films
 Adventure anime and manga
 Child characters in anime and manga
 Comedy anime and manga
 Comics characters introduced in 2001
 Fantasy anime and manga
Fictional dogs
 Films with screenplays by Mari Okada
Kadokawa Shoten manga
 Madhouse (company)
 Manga series
 Sanrio characters
 Shochiku
Shogakukan manga
Shōjo manga
 Slice of life anime and manga
 Viz Media manga